The 2021 Lucas Oil Late Model Dirt Series is the 16th season of the Lucas Oil Late Model Dirt Series, a national touring series for dirt late models owned & operated by Lucas Oil. The series began with the General Tire Winter Nationals at All-Tech Raceway on January 22, and ended with the Dirt Track World Championship at Portsmouth Raceway Park on October 16. Tim McCreadie won the 2021 drivers' championship. Ricky Thornton Jr. was crowned 2021 Rookie of the Year.

Teams and drivers

Complete schedule

Schedule and results

The 2021 schedule was released on October 14, 2020.

MavTV Plus streamed all 2021 races online.

Schedule notes and changes
 The Super Bowl of Racing scheduled for January 21-23 at the Golden Isles Raceway in Brunswick, Georgia was canceled due to concerns about COVID transmission in the local area.
 A rescheduled first night of the General Tire Winter Nationals at All-Tech Raceway in Lake City, Florida on January 22 was canceled due to rain.
 The Indiana Icebreaker scheduled for March 20 at the Brownstown Speedway was postponed mid-program after track conditions led to multiple flips during competition. The make-up was originally scheduled for May 2 was again postponed to September 23 after scheduled demolition of a track grandstand began in April.
 An Illinois doubleheader for the LOLMDS was canceled due to rain and cold. The canceled events included the Bullet Race Engines 50 at Tri-City Speedway in Granite City on April 23 and the Lucas Oil 100 at Macon Speedway on April 24.
 LOLMDS races scheduled for May 14th at the 411 Motor Speedway in Seymour, Tennessee and the Talladega Short Track in Eastaboga, Alabama were canceled due to gas shortages relating to the Colonial Pipeline hack.
 The CRST 50 at 34 Raceway in West Burlington, Iowa scheduled for May 22 was postponed to July 15 due to persistent rainfall.
 The June 19 finale of the Clash at the Mag at Magnolia Motor Speedway was canceled due to forecasts for heavy rain.
 The Gopher 50 scheduled for June 25 and 26 at Deer Creek Speedway in Spring Valley, Minnesota was rained out.
 The Grassy Smith Memorial scheduled for July 8 at the Cherokee Speedway in Gaffney, South Carolina was canceled due to Hurricane Elsa.
 The Mountain Moonshine Classic at Smoky Mountain Speedway in Maryville, Tennessee scheduled for July 9 was rained out. The second night of the event, originally scheduled for July 10, was postponed to October 8.
 The rescheduled CRST 50 at 34 Raceway was rained out for July 15.
 The NAPA Know How 50 at Tri-City Speedway in Granite City, Illinois scheduled for July 16 was canceled due to a bad forecast.
 The first preliminary night of the Topless 100 at Batesville Motor Speedway in Locust Grove, Arkansas scheduled for August 19 was rained out.
 The finale of the Rumble by the River at Port Royal Speedway in Port Royal, Pennsylvania scheduled for August 28 was rained out.
 The GO-50 scheduled for September 15 at I-80 Speedway in Greenwood, Nebraska was canceled due to ongoing tire shortages.
 The Hillbilly 100 scheduled for September 5 at Tyler County Speedway in Middlebourne, West Virginia was rained out and rescheduled for April 8, 2022.
 The rescheduled Mountain Moonshine Classic at Smoky Mountain Speedway in Maryville, Tennessee for October 8 was rained out.

Season summary

Race reports
Round 1: 2021 General Tire Winter Nationals

Kyle Larson passed Tyler Erb for the lead on lap 14 and proceeded to obliterate the field in the LOLMDS season opener, lapping up to the eighth-place car and winning the 50-lap feature by more than 15 seconds over runner-up Devin Moran. The feature went caution-free.

Round 2: 2021 Winternationals - Feature #1

Hudson O'Neal used the low side to hold off a hard-charging Brandon Sheppard during a green-white-checkered finish to win the season's first feature at East Bay Raceway Park. O'Neal led the final 11 laps of the race after race leader Tyler Erb spun as a result of contact with Devin Moran. 10 yellow flags slowed the 30-lap Winternationals opener for the series.

Round 3: 2021 Winternationals - Feature #2

Tyler Erb snuck under Brandon Overton exiting turn 2 with three laps to go in the 30-lap feature, then prevailed on a one-lap restart after the caution flag flew on lap 30 to score his first win of 2021. Erb charged from ninth to the race lead to score the win in a caution-filled feature that was slowed by five yellows and a lap 1 red flag "Big One" that saw Tim McCreadie, Gregg Satterlee, Frank Heckenast Jr. and Dennis Erb Jr. collected after Shane Clanton got sideways in turn 2.

Round 4: 2021 Winternationals - Feature #3

Josh Richards led the final 34 laps of the first 40-lap Winternationals feature, taking the lead from Florida late model ace Mark Whitener on lap 7. For the second consecutive race, the finish came down to a one-lap shootout, with Richards holding off Brandon Overton. As with every race at East Bay this season, the feature was full of incidents, with the caution flag flying eight times, five of which were for multi-car incidents.

Round 5: 2021 Winternationals - Feature #4

Stormy Scott charged to the front early and took the lead from Brian Shirley on lap 7 of 40, riding the low side on a super slick East Bay surface to score his first career LOLMDS victory. Scott went unchallenged for the win during a long green-flag run to close out the feature. Two incidents of note marked this feature; lap 5 saw Mason Zeigler spin Tyler Erb in turn 1 after the two had been racing close-quarters since the drop of the green flag, while lap 14 saw a "Big One" involving more than a dozen cars block the track in turn 2 after Frank Heckenast Jr. came down on Shane Clanton in turn 1 and sent him spinning.

Round 6: 2021 Winternationals - Feature #5

Brandon Overton dominated the second half of Friday's 50-lap feature to score his first LOLMDS win of 2021, proving untouchable out front after the first half of the race produced four different leaders. The race went 20 caution-free laps to start but would be slowed by two lengthy stoppages; one under a lap 25 yellow after Bobby Pierce knocked down wall panels in turn 4, and again on lap 30 when the red flag flew for Chase Junghans flipping after contact with Mason Zeigler. Zeigler was in the middle of numerous incidents on the night, including contact with Tyler Erb in a heat race that would see Erb parked for the night; Erb slammed into Zeigler's car on the cooldown lap of their heat race.

Round 7: 2021 Winternationals - Feature #5

Tyler Erb returned to competition with a vengeance after being parked the night before at East Bay, besting Tim McCreadie with 18 laps to go and holding off a deep-charging Jonathan Davenport to win the Winternationals finale feature, becoming the first repeat LOLMDS tour winner in 2021.

Round 8: 2021 K&N Filters Winter Nationals - Feature #1

Ricky Thornton Jr. took the lead on lap 14 and weathered several late-race cautions and a mid-race charge from Hudson O'Neal to win the 40-lap feature at Bubba Raceway Park. Brian Shirley led the opening 11 laps before ceding to Jonathan Davenport. Davenport found trouble on a lap 14 restart, which saw Thornton take the lead after Davenport locked up a tire entering turn 1, triggering a wreck that took out contenders Brandon Sheppard and Jimmy Owens.

Round 9: 2021 K&N Filters Winter Nationals - Feature #2

Shane Clanton snapped a winless streak dating back to 2019 in the final Florida Speedweeks feature for the LOLMDS, taking the lead from Bobby Pierce on lap 22 of the 40-lap feature and never again being challenged for the win after spending the first half of the race dueling with defending series champion Jimmy Owens.

Round 10: 2021 Buckeye Spring 50

Prevailing in a three-wide battle for the lead on a lap 9 restart over Kyle Strickler and Devin Moran, Hudson O'Neal led the final 40-plus laps of the Buckeye Spring 50, scoring the $12,000 win after keeping Tim McCreadie at bay on a final restart with two laps to go. The track opted to start all 29 cars in the feature in lieu of running a B-main.

Round 11: 2021 Nininger Tribute

Tim McCreadie got underneath Ricky Thornton Jr. in turn 2 on the final lap to score his first LOLMDS win of the season in dramatic fashion, having erased a 1.1-second lead in the final five laps. Thornton Jr. had led every lap of the feature prior to the last one and seemed to struggle with trying to lap Devin Moran as the feature wound down. McCreadie had run second for much of the race and actually got to Thornton's bumper on lap 25 but couldn't challenge for the lead.

Round 12: 2021 River Valley 40

Jonathan Davenport became the first polesitter to win a LOLMDS feature in 2021, leading all 40 laps at Port Royal. Shane Clanton made it interesting in the closing laps, getting alongside Davenport several times but proving unable to make the pass stick.

Round 13: 2021 John Bradshaw Memorial

Jonathan Davenport scored a last-lap victory at Ponderosa Speedway, getting to the high side on race leader Tim McCreadie who got stuck behind lapped traffic exiting turn 4 coming to the checkers. McCreadie, who led all but a handful of laps in the feature after a mid-race duel with Mike Marlar, had actually been bailed out by a caution flag on lap 15, with Davenport set to pass him for the lead immediately prior to the yellow flag flying.

Round 14: 2021 Ralph Latham Memorial

Florence Speedway fixture Josh Rice pressed race leader Hudson O'Neal for more than 20 laps before finally besting him, passing O'Neal in turn 2 with four laps to go and driving off to the biggest win of his career in front of packed grandstands. O'Neal had kept Rice at bay despite repeated slide jobs in turn 2, but heavy lapped traffic in the closing laps got O'Neal off line just enough for Rice to make the winning pass.

References

Lucas Oil Late Model Dirt Series